"Changing" is a song by British record production duo Sigma. It was co-written by TMS, Wayne Hector and Ella Eyre. The song features English singer Paloma Faith, most associated with her pop and soul ballads. This song was  
heard on Vodafone commercials in October 2017 for the brand-new ″Proud″ campaign.

"Changing" was released as the third single from their debut studio album Life (2015) on 14 September 2014, reaching number one for one week, becoming Faith's first UK number-one single and Sigma's second. An alternate version of the song appears on Faith's album A Perfect Contradiction: Outsiders' Edition.

Music video
The official music video, directed by Craig Moore, was uploaded to YouTube on 17 July 2014. It was shot in Miami. Both Sigma and Faith feature in the video. As of 12 October 2020, it has accumulated over 56 million views.

Track listing
Digital download
 "Changing" (featuring Paloma Faith) – 3:11

Digital download – remixes
 "Changing" (Sigma's VIP remix) (featuring Stylo G) – 3:28
 "Changing" (Klingande remix) – 5:59
 "Changing" (Purple Disco Machine remix) – 5:11
 "Changing" (Majestic remix) – 4:49
 "Changing" (Naxxos remix) – 4:44
 "Changing" (Zoo Station club edit) – 5:44

Charts

Weekly charts

Year-end charts

Certifications

References

2014 singles
2014 songs
Sigma songs
Paloma Faith songs
Number-one singles in Scotland
UK Singles Chart number-one singles
Songs written by Peter Kelleher (songwriter)
Songs written by Ben Kohn
Songs written by Tom Barnes (songwriter)
Songs written by Wayne Hector
Songs written by Ella Eyre
Song recordings produced by TMS (production team)
All Around the World Productions singles
3 Beat Records singles